In military terms, 80th Division or 80th Infantry Division may refer to:

 Infantry divisions 

80th Division (People's Republic of China)
80th Reserve Division (German Empire) 
80th Division (IDF) (Israel)
80th Rifle Division (Soviet Union)
80th Infantry (Reserve) Division (United Kingdom) 
80th Division (United States) (formerly 80th Airborne Division)

See also
 80th Regiment (disambiguation)
 80th Squadron (disambiguation)